Joghdi (also Romanized as Joghdī; also known as Joghdt) is a village in the Shoqan Rural District, Jolgeh Shoqan District, Jajrom County, North Khorasan Province, Iran. Per the 2006 census, its population was 112, with 31 families.

References 

Populated places in Jajrom County